Keklikdere can refer to:

 Keklikdere, Palu
 Keklikdere, Silvan